Kandi Raj College, established in 1950, is a college in Kandi, in Murshidabad district. It offers undergraduate courses in arts and sciences. It is affiliated to University of Kalyani.

History
Kandi Raj College was established in 1950, aiming at providing low-cost higher education. The college started its journey under the guidance of the First President of the Governing Body, Arun Chandra Sinha and the first principal, Dr. D.L. Das. At that time, it was affiliated to University of Calcutta. It is currently affiliated to University of Kalyani.

With the establishment of Kandi Raj College in 1950 the long cherished dreams of the people of Kandi Sub division were finally fulfilled. With just 61 students, the college started its journey on 4 September 1950, occupying only five rooms of Kandi Raj High School. Government of West Bengal elevated it to the status of “Government Sponsored” during the academic session 1956–57. Under-graduate courses first started in 1957–58.

After the sad demise of Atish Chandra Sinha in March, 2010, his brother Dr. Bikash Sinha, the renowned scientist has taken the chair of the President of the college.

Departments

Science

Chemistry
Physics
Mathematics
Computer Science
Botany
Physiology
Zoology

Arts

Bengali
English
Sanskrit
History
Geography
Political Science
Philosophy
Economics

Accreditation
The college is recognized by the University Grants Commission (UGC).

See also

References

External links
Kandi Raj College
University of Kalyani
University Grants Commission
National Assessment and Accreditation Council

Colleges affiliated to University of Kalyani
Educational institutions established in 1950
Universities and colleges in Murshidabad district
1950 establishments in West Bengal